Robert Nicols Martin (January 14, 1798 – July 20, 1870) was an American politician from Maryland.

Martin was born in Cambridge, Maryland, where he attended the public schools.  He studied law, was admitted to the bar, and practised at Princess Anne from 1819 to 1827.  He was elected to the Nineteenth Congress, where he served from March 4, 1825 to March 3, 1827.

After his term, Martin settled in Baltimore and resumed the practice of law.  He was appointed by Governor Thomas Pratt as judge of the Maryland Court of Appeals and as chief justice of the western judicial district in 1845, in which capacity he served until the office was vacated by the Maryland Constitution of 1851.  He again engaged in the practice of his profession in Baltimore.  He later served as judge of the superior court of Baltimore from 1859 to 1867, and as professor of international law at the University of Maryland, Baltimore from 1867 to 1870.  He died at Saratoga Springs, New York, and is interred in the Christ Protestant Episcopal Church Cemetery in Cambridge.

References

1798 births
1870 deaths
Judges of the Maryland Court of Appeals
People from Cambridge, Maryland
University of Maryland, Baltimore faculty
National Republican Party members of the United States House of Representatives from Maryland
People from Princess Anne, Maryland
19th-century American judges